Dervişcemal is a village in the Hozat District, Tunceli Province, Turkey. The village is populated by Kurds of Abasan tribe and had a population of 72 in 2021.

References 

Kurdish settlements in Tunceli Province
Villages in Hozat District